Prandial relates to a meal. Postprandial (from post prandium) means after eating a meal, while preprandial is before a meal.

Usages of postprandial

The term postprandial is used in many contexts.

Gastronomic or social
Refers to activities performed after a meal, such as drinking cocktails or smoking.

Medical
A common use is in relation to blood sugar (or blood glucose) levels, which are normally measured 2 hours after and before eating in a postprandial glucose test. This is because blood glucose levels usually rise after a meal. The American Diabetes Association recommends a postprandial glucose level under 180 mg/dl and a preprandial plasma glucose between 70 and 130 mg/dl.

Other uses of postprandial include:

 Postprandial dip is a mild decrease in blood sugar after eating a big meal.
 Postprandial hyperglycemia (PPHG) is high blood sugar following a meal. It can be evaluated in a postprandial glucose test.
 Postprandial hypotension is a drastic decline in blood pressure which happens after eating a meal.
 Postprandial regurgitation is a unique symptom of rumination syndrome.
 Postprandial thermogenesis is heat production due to metabolism after a meal, temporarily increasing the metabolic rate.
 Postprandial abdominal distension usually refers to bloating of the abdomen following a meal, especially a large one. It is generally harmless, but tends to be uncomfortable. Instances of its sudden onset or prolonged duration can, however, be symptoms of certain severe adverse gastro-intestinal conditions such as irritable bowel disease.Postprandial abdominal distension is also a documented side effect of some medications.

Processes
In the postprandium, there is digestion of food in the gastrointestinal tract, followed by uptake and various metabolic processes, mainly anabolic ones (building organic molecules from smaller units). The postprandium is characterized by an increased activity of the parasympathetic nervous system, putting the body in a state of "rest and digest".

References

Medical terminology